Steven Sills is an American screenwriter and film producer.

Born on Fort Bliss, an army base in El Paso, Texas, Sills grew up in Bedford, New Hampshire.

Sills  attended film school at New York University Tisch School of the Arts. In 1991, he was chosen as a Lew Wasserman Fellow and interned at Universal Studios.

In 1995, Sills was selected as a Henry Luce Scholar and spent a year in Tokyo, Japan, working as a visiting writer/producer at NHK. He remained in Japan for 4 years and worked as a copy editor at The Japan Times, a freelance magazine writer and an expat stand-up comic.

His feature screenwriting debut, Sinner, was awarded Best Narrative Feature by the 41st Brooklyn Arts Council International Film and Video Festival and Best Feature Film Award  at the  2007 Buffalo Niagara Film Festival. It was also accepted as an official selection in the 2007 Vail Film Festival, 2007 Newport Beach Film Festival, and 2007 Garden State Film Festival, and the 2007 Boston International Film Festival.

Sills is a distant relative of Sylvanus Bowser.

Sills resides in Newburyport, Massachusetts with his wife, Melissa.

Awards
 Best Screenplay, 2007 Newport  Beach Film Festival
 Best Screenplay, 41st Brooklyn Arts Council International Film & Video Festival

Filmography
As writer:
 Sinner (2007)

As producer:
 Finding Fritztown (2020)
 Sironia (2010)
 Sinner (2007)
  A&E Biography of the Year (2004)
  Pink (2006) for adicolor, with director Charlie White
 Asia Live, NHK (1996–97)

References

Film Threat review of Sinner
ReelTalk review of Sinner
Interview with Sills on BuffaloRising.com
TV interview on Gregory Mantell Show

External links 
 

Year of birth missing (living people)
Living people
American male screenwriters
Tisch School of the Arts alumni
People from El Paso, Texas
American male writers
Screenwriters from Texas